Butaclamol (AY-23,028) is a typical antipsychotic which was never marketed. Sold as the hydrochloride salt for use in research, the compound acts as a dopamine receptor antagonist.

Chemistry
pKa = 7.15 (uncorrected for ionic strength)

References

Abandoned drugs
Tertiary alcohols
Antipsychotics
Dopamine antagonists
Sigma receptor ligands
Tert-butyl compounds